Victorieuse (Victorious) was the second ship of the  of wooden-hulled, armored corvettes built for the French Navy during the 1870s. Her construction was delayed for years and the navy took advantage of the extended construction time to upgrade her armament in comparison to the lead ship, . Unlike her sisters, Victorieuse did not see any combat although she participated in the pacification of the Marquesas Islands in 1880. She was condemned in 1900.

Design and description
The La Galissonnière-class ironclads were designed as faster, more heavily armed versions of the s by Henri Dupuy de Lôme. They used the same central battery layout as their predecessors, although the battery was lengthened  to provide enough room to work the larger  guns. Victorieuse and her sister ship  were modified by Sabattier who reduced the number of screws from two to one to improve their sailing qualities, added an  bow chaser under the forecastle and increased the caliber and number of the secondary armament.

Her crew numbered between 352 and 382 officers and men.

Propulsion
Victorieuse had a single vertical compound steam engine driving a single propeller. Her engine was powered by four oval boilers. During sea trials her engine produced  and the ship reached .

Armament
Victorieuse mounted four of her six 240-millmeter Modèle 1870 guns in the central battery on the battery deck. The other two 240-millimeter guns were mounted in barbettes on the upper deck, sponsoned out over the sides of the ship, just forward of the funnel. A 194-millimeter chase gun was fitted under the forecastle. Victorieuses secondary armament of six  guns was also mounted on the upper deck.

The guns could fire both solid shot and explosive shells.

The ship also mounted four  Hotchkiss 5-barrel revolving guns. They had a rate of fire of about 30 rounds per minute. Victorieuse also received several towed Harvey torpedoes.

Armor
The unarmored portions of their sides were protected by thin iron plates.

Service
Victorieuse was laid down at Toulon on 5 August 1869 and launched on 18 November 1875. While the exact reason for such prolonged construction time is not known, the budget for the French Navy was cut after the Franco-Prussian War of 1870–71 and the French dockyards had not been reformed with working practices more suitable for the industrial age. The ship was commissioned for her sea trials on 12 November 1876 and she was placed in reserve in Toulon after they were completed. She was recommissioned as the flagship of the Pacific Squadron on 17 August 1878 under the command of Rear Admiral Abel-Nicolas Bergasse du Petit-Thouars. The ship participated in the pacification of the Marquesas Islands in 1880, which had been conquered by the admiral's uncle (and adoptive father) Abel Aubert du Petit-Thouars forty years before. Victorieuse returned to Toulon on 23 May 1881.

The ship was recommissioned as the flagship of the China Squadron on 1 December 1881 under the command of Rear Admiral Meyer. She was relieved by her sister La Galissonnière in April 1884. She became flagship of the Levant Squadron after she arrived in France, but was in bad shape and soon placed in reserve at Cherbourg. Victorieuse became the flagship of Rear Admiral Barrera, second-in-command of the Northern Squadron on 10 February 1892. The ship was on summer maneuvers off the Iberian coast in July 1893. Two years later she became the flagship of Rear Admiral Ménard. She was initially condemned in May 1897, but this was reversed so she could convoy torpedo boats to Bizerte. That plan was later cancelled and Victorieuse was paid off in 1899, becoming guardship of the outer harbor at Brest until finally condemned the following year.

Footnotes

References
 

 
 

 

Ships built in France
La Galissonnière-class ironclads
Corvettes of France
1875 ships